Pegsunercept is a drug for the treatment of rheumatoid arthritis. , Phase II clinical trials have been completed. It is being developed by Amgen.

Similarly to etanercept, pegsunercept is a soluble tumor necrosis factor receptor. Pegsunercept is a PEGylated protein.

References 

TNF inhibitors
Immunosuppressants
Amgen